Hermeuptychia sosybius, the Carolina satyr, is a butterfly of the family Nymphalidae. It is found in the United States from southern New Jersey south along the coast to southern Florida, west to south-eastern Kansas, central Oklahoma and central Texas. It is also found in Mexico.

The wingspan is 32–38 mm. The upperside is brown without markings. The underside is also brown, but with small eyespots rimmed with yellow on both wings. They feed on sap and rotting fruit.

Its larvae can feed upon the highly-invasive Japanese stilt grass Microstegium vimineum, so populations of this butterfly are potentially at risk from efforts to remove stilt grass. The endangered Mitchell's Satyr Neonympha mitchellii is also able to feed upon stilt grass.

The larvae also feed on various Poaceae species, including Axonopus compressus, Eremochloa ophiuroides, Stenotaphrum secundatum and Poa pratensis.

References

Butterflies described in 1793
Euptychiina